In Greek mythology, Car or Kar (Ancient Greek: Κάρ) of the Carians, according to Herodotus, was the brother of Lydus and Mysus. He was regarded as the eponymous and ancestral hero of the Carians who would have received their name from the king. He may or may not be the same as Car of Megara

Mythology
Herodotus mentions Car, brother of Lydus and Mysus; the three brothers were believed to have been the ancestral heroes and eponyms of the Carians, the Lydians and the Mysians respectively. This Car was credited by Pliny the Elder with inventing the auspicia.

Car was also said to have founded the city Alabanda, which he named after Alabandus, his son by Callirhoe (the daughter of the river god Maeander).  In turn, Alabandus's name is said to have been chosen in commemoration of his Car's victory in a horse fight— according to the scholar Stephanus of Byzantium, "Alabandos" was the Carian word for "winner in a horse fight". Another son of Car, Idrieus, had the city Idrias named after himself.

The tomb of Car was in the Carian city Souangela, giving that city its name— according to Stephanus, "Souangela" meant "tomb of the king" in Carian.

Notes

References 
Herodotus, The Histories with an English translation by A. D. Godley. Cambridge. Harvard University Press. 1920. Online version at the Topos Text Project. Greek text available at Perseus Digital Library.
Pliny the Elder, The Natural History. John Bostock, M.D., F.R.S. H.T. Riley, Esq., B.A. London. Taylor and Francis, Red Lion Court, Fleet Street. 1855. Online version at the Perseus Digital Library.
Pliny the Elder, Naturalis Historia. Karl Friedrich Theodor Mayhoff. Lipsiae. Teubner. 1906. Latin text available at the Perseus Digital Library.
Stephanus of Byzantium, Stephani Byzantii Ethnicorum quae supersunt, edited by August Meineike (1790-1870), published 1849. A few entries from this important ancient handbook of place names have been translated by Brady Kiesling. Online version at the Topos Text Project.

Legendary progenitors
Kings in Greek mythology
Carian people